Woodbury High School may refer to schools in the United States:

Monroe-Woodbury High School in Central Valley, New York
Woodbury Central High School in Moville, Iowa
Woodbury High School (Minnesota)
Woodbury Junior-Senior High School in Woodbury, New Jersey	
Woodbury Mennonite Church School in Woodbury, Pennsylvania (grades 1–10 only)